Jiří Pecka (June 4, 1917 – May 12, 1997) was a Czechoslovak slalom and sprint canoeist who competed from the late 1940s to the late 1950s. He was born in Prague (where he also died).

Pecka won a silver medal in the C-2 10000 m event at the 1948 Summer Olympics in London. He also won a bronze medal in the C-2 1000 m event at the 1950 ICF Canoe Sprint World Championships in Copenhagen.

At the ICF Canoe Slalom World Championships he won a total of four medals with a gold (Mixed C-2: |1955), a silver (C-2 team: 1951) and two bronzes (C-2: 1951, C-2 team: 1953).

References

External links 
 Jiri PECKA at CanoeSlalom.net

1917 births
1997 deaths
Canoeists at the 1948 Summer Olympics
Czechoslovak male canoeists
Olympic canoeists of Czechoslovakia
Olympic silver medalists for Czechoslovakia
Olympic medalists in canoeing
ICF Canoe Sprint World Championships medalists in Canadian
Medalists at the 1948 Summer Olympics
Medalists at the ICF Canoe Slalom World Championships
Canoeists from Prague